Chris Corning (born September 7, 1999) is an American snowboarder. He competed in big air and slopestyle at Winter X Games XXII.

He won a bronze medal in slopestyle at the FIS Freestyle Ski and Snowboarding World Championships 2017. He was selected to participate in the 2018 Winter Olympics, placing 4th in the big air contest and 17th in slopestyle. In 2018 he placed 2nd in the Burton US Open, behind Mark McMorris.

He won a gold medal in slopestyle at the FIS Freestyle Ski and Snowboarding World Championships 2019 in Utah.

He competed in the 2022 Winter Olympics, placing 6th in slopestyle, and 7th in big air.

References

External links

X Games Profile

1999 births
Living people
X Games athletes
American male snowboarders
Snowboarders at the 2018 Winter Olympics
Snowboarders at the 2022 Winter Olympics
Olympic snowboarders of the United States
21st-century American people
People from Summit County, Colorado